The Kahurangi River is a short river in the northwest of New Zealand's South Island. It flows through the northwest of the Kahurangi National Park, reaching the Tasman Sea just to the south of Kahurangi Point.

See also
List of rivers of New Zealand

References

Rivers of the West Coast, New Zealand
Kahurangi National Park
Rivers of New Zealand